Copenhagen Castle was a castle on the islet of Slotsholmen in central Copenhagen, Denmark. It was built in the late 14th century and was located at the site of the current Christiansborg Palace.

History
In 1167, Bishop  Absalon (c. 1128–1201) founded a fortress on the islet of Slotsholmen in the harbour of Copenhagen. It consisted of a courtyard with several buildings and surrounded by a wall for protection. During the years after the demolition of Bishop Absalon's Castle by the Hansa League in 1369, the ruins on the island were covered with earthworks, on which the new stronghold, Copenhagen Castle, was built. In 1343 King Valdemar Atterdag took over Absalon's castle, but upon his death in 1375 the right to the property returned to the Diocese of Roskilde.

The castle had a curtain wall and was surrounded by a moat which had an inner diameter of about 50 meters  and with a large, solid tower as an entrance gate. The castle was still the property of the Bishop of Roskilde until King Eric of Pomerania usurped the rights to the castle in 1417. The attack was fought back by in 1428 by Queen Philippa, who led the defense from Copenhagen Castle.

From the middle of the 15th century, the castle served as the Danish monarch's main residence and center of government.
The castle was expanded and rebuilt several times. King Christian IV, added a spire to the large entrance tower, which under the name of the Blue Tower gained a reputation as a prison. In 1556 an organ was built for the castle's chapel by Hermann Rodensteen; one of the major organ builders of the 16th century. In the 1720s, King Frederik IV entirely rebuilt the castle, but it became so heavy that the walls began to give way and to crack. It became therefore evident to King Christian VI, Frederik IV's successor, immediately after his accession to the throne in 1730, that an entirely new castle had to be built. The demolition of the overextended and antiquated Copenhagen Castle was commenced in 1731 to make room for the first Christiansborg Palace.

References

Other sources
Frydendal, Flemming (red) (2005)  Ruinerne under Christiansborg (København: Slots- og Ejendomsstyrelsen)  
Hvidt, Kristian; Ellehøj, Svend; Norn, Otto (1975)  Christiansborg Slot I-II. Udgivet af Folketingets præsidium (København: Nyt Nordisk Forlag Arnold Busck)

External links 

 Official website of Christiansborg Palace

14th-century fortifications
Buildings and structures demolished in 1731
14th-century establishments in Denmark
1731 disestablishments in Denmark
Castles in Denmark
Former buildings and structures in Copenhagen
History of Copenhagen
Demolished buildings and structures in Denmark
Slotsholmen